The C.E. Gaines Center is a basketball arena on the campus of Winston-Salem State University.  It is named for former WSSU men's basketball coach Clarence "Bighouse" Gaines, who led the men's basketball team for 47 years.  The facility has a capacity of 3,200 spectators and opened in 1978.

College basketball venues in the United States
Basketball venues in North Carolina
Winston-Salem State Rams men's basketball
Sports venues in Winston-Salem, North Carolina
1978 establishments in North Carolina
Sports venues completed in 1978